The National Library of Public Information is a public library in South District, Taichung, Taiwan.

History
The library was established in 1923 as Taichu Prefectural Library. After the handover of Taiwan from Japan to the Republic of China in 1945 and Taiwan became the province of the republic, the library was named Taiwan Provincial Taichung Library from March 1946 until June 1999. In July 1999, it was renamed to National Taichung Library and it came under the jurisdiction of Council for Cultural Affairs. In January 2013, it was renamed National Library of Public Information.

Architecture
The current building of the library consists of five stories above ground and two stories underground with a total floor area of 41,797 m2.

Branches
The library has three branches, which are the Liming Branch, Jing Wu Branch and Zhongxing Branch.

Transportation
The library is accessible within walking distance south west from Taichung Station of Taiwan Railways.

Directors

National Library of Public Information
 Liu Zhong-cheng (September 2016 -)
 Lu Chun-jiao (January 2013 - August 2016)

National Taichung Library
 Lu Chun-jiao (January 2010 - December 2012)
 Su Zhong (July 2008 - January 2010)
 Yang Xuan-qin (March 2007 - July 2008)
 Hong Qing-feng (January 2007 - March 2007)
 Xue Mao-song (January 2003 - January 2007)
 Cheng Liang-xiong (July 1999 - January 2003)

Taiwan Provincial Taichung Library
 Cheng Liang-xiong (November 1991 - June 1999)
 Chen Zu-rong (April 1987 - November 1991)

See also
 Taichung

References

External links

 

1923 establishments in Taiwan
Libraries established in 1923
Libraries in Taichung
Public libraries in Taiwan